The Greenville Staplers were an East Texas League baseball team based in Greenville, Texas, United States that played during the 1923 season. Notable players include Ed Appleton, Uel Eubanks and Chick Sorrells.

References

Baseball teams established in 1923
Defunct minor league baseball teams
Sports clubs disestablished in 1923
1923 establishments in Texas
1923 disestablishments in Texas
Hunt County, Texas
Defunct baseball teams in Texas
Baseball teams disestablished in 1923
East Texas League teams